Daniel Giguère (1957-...) was the last mayor of Ville de Jonquière from November 7, 1999 until February 18, 2002, when the city was amalgamated into Saguenay. Before becoming mayor, he had been advisor on the city council of the mayor Marcel Martel from 1991 to 1999. Between 1998 and 2002, he led a wide coalition against gas companies in Quebec.

Between December 2008 and October 2010, Daniel Giguère he had worked for the Quebec's government as chief of staff of Monique Gagnon-Tremblay, MNA and president of Quebec's Treasury board and as special advisor for minister Dominique Vien, in charge of Government's services.

He has been Public Affairs Manager for EDF EN Canada between 2010 and 2014. Since July 2014, he is the Public Affaires Manager and Government Relations - Eastern Region of Canada for Innergex Renewable Energy.

Giguère also ran as a Liberal Party of Canada candidate for the 2004 Canadian federal election in the riding of Jonquière—Alma. Sébastien Gagnon of the Bloc Québécois defeated him.

Giguère also ran in the 1997 Canadian federal election, for the Progressive Conservative Party of Canada in the riding of Jonquière, but lost to Jocelyne Girard-Bujold of the Bloc Québécois.

References

1957 births
Candidates in the 2004 Canadian federal election
Living people
Mayors of places in Quebec
Politicians from Saguenay, Quebec
Liberal Party of Canada candidates for the Canadian House of Commons
Progressive Conservative Party of Canada candidates for the Canadian House of Commons
Candidates in the 1997 Canadian federal election